The Landuma also called Landoma, Landima, Landouma, Cocoli, Kokoli, Tiapi, or Tyapi are an African people who live primarily in Guinea, in the area of the Upper Nunez. They have been described as "pre-Mandingas", as they settled in the region before the arrival of the Mande people. In this respect Walter Rodney places them alongside the Nalu people, the Baga people and the Temne people.

References

Ethnic groups in Guinea
Ethnic groups in Guinea-Bissau